Mazzeo is an Italian surname. Notable people with the surname include:

Fabio Mazzeo (born 1983), Italian footballer
Rafe Mazzeo (born 1961), American mathematician
Rosario Mazzeo (1911–1997), American clarinetist
Vince Mazzeo (born 1964), American politician
Tilar J. Mazzeo (born 1971), American writer
Larry Mathews (born Mazzeo 1955), American child actor: The Dick Van Dyke Show

See also
Mazzeo Island, an island of Antarctica

Italian-language surnames